Olav Søyland (26 July 1921 – 9 April 2001) was a Norwegian politician for the Christian Democratic Party.

He served as a deputy representative to the Parliament of Norway from Telemark during the terms 1965–1969 and 1969–1973. In total he met during 73 days of parliamentary session. He hailed from Porsgrunn.

References

1921 births
2001 deaths
Deputy members of the Storting
Christian Democratic Party (Norway) politicians
Politicians from Telemark
Politicians from Porsgrunn